The Grafting of Life (Persian: Peyvande zendegi) is a 1953 Iranian film directed by Ebrahim Moradi.

Cast
 Abdullah Basirat 
 Reza Mirfattah 
 Ebrahim Moradi

References

Bibliography 
 Mohammad Ali Issari. Cinema in Iran, 1900-1979. Scarecrow Press, 1989.

External links 
 

1953 films
1950s Persian-language films
Films directed by Ebrahim Moradi
Iranian black-and-white films